Fur: An Imaginary Portrait of Diane Arbus (also known simply as Fur) is a 2006 American romantic drama film directed by Steven Shainberg and written by Erin Cressida Wilson, based on Patricia Bosworth's book Diane Arbus: A Biography. It stars Nicole Kidman as iconic American photographer Diane Arbus, who was known for her strange, disturbing images, and also features Robert Downey Jr. and Ty Burrell. As the title implies, the film is largely fictional.

Plot
The movie opens with Diane Arbus arriving to shoot pictures at a nudist colony. The story then flashes back to three months earlier in New York City, 1958. Diane Arbus plays assistant to her photographer husband Allan. Diane is from a wealthy family; her father is a furrier. Allan's family has run a photo studio for decades. 
Diane is clearly uncomfortable with the tepid life of a city wife and mother (to their two girls). One night during a party, she is gazing out the window and catches the eye of the mysterious neighbor who has just moved in upstairs. His face is completely covered except for the eyes and mouth. That evening after the party, Diane stands on their patio, opens her dress and exposes her bra. She admits this to her husband. 
A few days later, her daughter informs her of a problem with the plumbing. Opening up a pipe, Diane discovers clumps of hair blocking it. As she removes the hair, a key tumbles down. She takes the hair and key out to the trash, and then buzzes her upstairs neighbor to ask if he's been grooming a dog. He says no, and then suggests she look in the basement, which she does. She sees an ornate chair and a sideshow poster of a "wild man," which an armless woman then dusts off. Diane assumes she's the wife of the neighbor. 
When she can't sleep, Diane grabs the camera (that her husband had gifted her years before, and she'd as of yet never used), and goes upstairs to introduce herself to her neighbor, and ask if she could shoot his portrait. He asks her if she got the key, and then tells her to return the next night. She leaves, and then goes to grab the key out of the trash.

Thus begins her relationship with Lionel Sweeney, a man with hypertrichosis who is in demand as a wigmaker. Lionel sees in Diane a kindred spirit, and he takes her places where she meets transvestites, dwarves and others living on the fringes of society. Diane tells Allan she'd like to take time off from the business to take her own photographs, starting with the neighbors. He's supportive of her. As Diane spends more with Lionel, she grows more attracted to him and this new, strange and exciting world. She's taking photographs, but hides the undeveloped film in a cookie jar. The key was to Lionel's apartment, so Diane can let herself in at any time.

Lionel asks to be introduced to Diane's husband. Soon Diane has brought Lionel even into her family life. Her children help him with his wig making business, and he reads bedtime stories to them. She introduces him to her mother and father. At her and Allan's anniversary party, Diane finds Lionel breathing in some substance. He admits that his lungs are disintegrating, and within a few months he'll be "drowning." She cries at this news. They almost kiss, but are interrupted by Allan, who sees their intimate moment, and then leaves. Later at home, he asks Diane if she'd kissed him, but then realizes it doesn't matter if they have or if they haven't, that he knows her feelings towards Lionel. He begs her not to tear their family apart. Diane agrees to end the affair, and dresses and goes upstairs to do so. 
When she lets herself in to Lionel's, she finds him naked with shaving cream and razor in hand. He asks her to completely shave him. When he's naked, they make love. When she asks why he wanted to be shaved (after previously professing it wasn't worth the effort), he reveals he intends to "swim out," to commit suicide in the ocean, and wants her to be with him when he does it. She's devastated but agrees. They profess their love for each other, and Diane finally takes a picture of Lionel for the first time. Meanwhile, her daughter, having found her film stash, gives it to Allan to develop: he sees that his wife has been taking meaningless pictures until then, instead of the portraits she had said she was shooting.

At the beach, Lionel presents Diane with a gift: a fur jacket, made from his own hair. She walks with Lionel to the edge of the water, and watches as he gleefully swims out.

She returns to her home, and as she puts the key in the door, realizes she cannot go in, back to her old life. Allan, standing on the other side of the door, does nothing. Diane returns to Lionel's apartment, rolls in his bed, and breathes the air he'd blown into a life raft to inflate it. Suddenly, she's surrounded by all of Lionel's friends, and they have a party to honor him. One of his friends gives her a photo album Lionel wanted her to have. It has fifty empty pages, all with photo plate tags in Lionel's handwriting: while number one is titled "Lionel", for the portrait he had taken of him, he wants her to fill them the rest of the pages with her other new photographs.

Diane, touched by her experience with Lionel, now knows what direction to take with her life and career. The final scene shows her at a nudist camp, where she meets a woman who assumes she wants to take her picture. Arbus admits this, but first asks the woman to tell her a secret. The woman asks Diane to tell her a secret first, and Diane agrees.

Cast
 Nicole Kidman as Diane Arbus
 Robert Downey Jr. as Lionel Sweeney
 Ty Burrell as Allan Arbus
 Harris Yulin as David Nemerov
 Jane Alexander as Gertrude Nemerov
 Emmy Clarke as Grace Arbus
 Genevieve McCarthy as Sophie Arbus
 Boris McGiver as Jack Henry
 Marceline Hugot as Tippa Henry
 Mary Duffy as Althea
 Agnes 'Peppermint' Moore

Production
For the film, director Shainberg, best known for his erotic indie film Secretary, reunited with its screenwriter, Erin Cressida Wilson, who used Patricia Bosworth's Diane Arbus: A Biography as a source. As its name implies, the film is a fictional account rather than an accurate biography. Mark Romanek had previously tried to direct and write a film based on Bosworth's biography for DreamWorks Pictures.

No pictures by Arbus herself are featured, as her estate refused approval.

The nudist camp of Camp Venus was shot at Sailors' Snug Harbor in Staten Island.

Reception
The film holds a 50 score on Metacritic, and holds a 32% from 111 reviews on Rotten Tomatoes. The Chicago Tribune gave the film 3 out of 4 stars: "The result is a revelatory, challenging and deeply affecting portrait, anchored by what may be Kidman's most profoundly moving performance." The Los Angeles Times criticized the "cop-out ending that undercuts its message about the unimportance of surface differences in favor of a glib finalities to have its cake and eat it too". Despite this, the newspaper continued to heap praise on Kidman and Downey Jr; "the remarkable acting of its two stars pulls you back in and keeps you watching. Kidman, the most consistently daring of today's top stars, is exceptionally convincing as someone whose interior process plays out in front of us. And Downey, for the most part using only his soulful, yearning eyes and a silky, urbane voice, creates a man no one could resist. Separately and together, they make us believe the unbelievable."

Soundtrack
The soundtrack to Fur was released on November 14, 2006.

References

External links
 
New York Times review

2006 films
Fur
2006 romantic drama films
Fur
Films about photographers
Films about sideshow performers
Films about disability
Films directed by Steven Shainberg
Films set in 1958
Films scored by Carter Burwell
Films shot in New York City
Picturehouse films
Cultural depictions of photographers
2006 drama films
2000s American films